Curtis Banks is a financial services company based in Bristol, United Kingdom and is one of the UK's largest independent of providers of Self Invested Personal Pension schemes (SIPP) and Small Self Administered Pension Schemes (SSAS) with over £37.4bn of assets under administration. It holds offices in Bristol, Dundee, and Ipswich.

Since its inception, Curtis Banks is said to have shown "a willingness to take over existing SIPPs", first by acquiring Montpelier Pension Administration Services for £399,999 in May 2011 and then the full SIPP business from Alliance Trust Savings for £7m in January 2013. After the ATS deal, Curtis Banks set up an office in Dundee's City House with around 40 members of staff brought over from Alliance Trust.

In January 2019, Curtis Banks launched its new 'Your Future SIPP', a fully digital product replacing its historical SIPP offerings.

On 23 July 2020, Curtis Banks announced agreements to acquire the SIPP and SSAS operator Talbot and Muir for a total consideration of up to £25.25m, and financial technology provider Dunstan Thomas for a total consideration of up to £27.5m.

References 

Financial services companies of the United Kingdom
Companies based in Bristol
2009 establishments in England
Financial services companies established in 2009
British companies established in 2009
Publicly traded companies
Pensions in the United Kingdom
Tax-advantaged savings plans in the United Kingdom